is a retired Japanese professional shogi player who achieved the rank of 7-dan.

He is known for wearing colorful suits on television programs as a shogi expert.

Promotion history
The promotion history for Kanki is as follows:
1978: 1-kyū
1979: 1-dan
1983, July 26: 4-dan
1988, January 17: 5-Dan
1996, April 11: 6-dan
2010, April 1: 7-dan
2011, June 1: Retired

Awards and honors
Kanki received the Japan Shogi Association’s received the "25 Years Service Award" in 2008 for being an active professional for 25 years.

References

External links
Kanki, Hiromitsu • Professional Player Info on ShogiHub
 

Living people
1940 births
Japanese shogi players
Retired professional shogi players
Professional shogi players from Hyōgo Prefecture
People from Kakogawa, Hyōgo
Shogi YouTubers
Japanese YouTubers